The 1968–69 Allsvenskan was the 35th season of the top division of Swedish handball. 10 teams competed in the league. HK Drott won the regular season, but SoIK Hellas won the playoffs and claimed their third Swedish title. UoIF Matteuspojkarna and Vikingarnas IF were relegated.

League table

Playoffs

Semifinals
 SoIK Hellas–Redbergslids IK 23–17, 25–17 (SoIK Hellas advance to the finals)
 Ystads IF–HK Drott 18–14, 15–16 (Ystads IF advance to the finals)

Finals
 SoIK Hellas–Ystads IF 26–16, 21–18 (SoIK Hellas champions)

References 

Swedish handball competitions